The Deadly Spawn is a 1983 American science fiction horror film directed by Douglas McKeown and starring Charles George Hildebrandt. In some territories, the film's title was changed to Return of the Aliens: The Deadly Spawn or The Return of the Alien's Deadly Spawn in an attempt to cash in on the worldwide success of Ridley Scott's 1979 film Alien.

It follows the story of a crash-landed alien that finds refuge in the basement of a house and grows to monstrous proportions, eating those unlucky enough to venture down. A handful of teenagers try to survive the onslaught of the creature and its young.

Plot
Two campers are nearby when a meteor falls to Earth. When they investigate, they are attacked and eaten by a bizarre life form that emerges from the crashed rock.

A house near the crash site is the home of Sam (James Brewster) and Barb (Elissa Neil), who are set to venture out of town, and their two children, college student and budding scientist Pete (Tom DeFranco) and his younger brother Charles (Charles George Hildebrandt), a monster movie fan. Visiting are Aunt Millie (Ethel Michelson) and Uncle Herb (John Schmerling). When a rainstorm sets in, Sam goes downstairs to check the basement for flooding and is eaten by the bizarre monstrosity. Barb suffers the same fate when she goes looking for him.

Pete sets up a study date with classmates Ellen (Jean Tafler), Frankie (Richard Lee Porter), and Kathy (Karen Tighe). Uncle Herb, a psychologist, and also preparing for a conference, wants to investigate Charles's interest in the macabre, and he holds a brief interview with the boy before he falls asleep in the living room. Aunt Millie heads over to her mother Bunny's (Judith Mayes) house for a luncheon with her retired friends. When an electrician arrives to investigate a circuit breaker malfunction in the basement, Charles dons a costume and goes down to scare him. There, he discovers the basement is infested with slug-like creatures feasting on the electrician's and his mother's remains, guarded by their huge mother, the monster from the meteor crash. After realizing that the eyeless creatures react to sound, he stands silently, escaping his parents' fate.

Meanwhile, Ellen and Frankie have discovered one of the tadpole creatures dead on the way over to the house, and deem it unlike any animal on Earth when they dissect it. Science fiction fan Frankie hypothesizes that the creature could be from outer space, but hard-nosed scientist Pete dismisses that theory. At Bunny's house, Millie arrives and they prepare the luncheon, unaware that the spawn have infested the house. When her guests arrive, the spawn creatures emerge and attack them. The women fight back and manage to escape in Millie's car.

Back at the house, Pete, Ellen and Frankie seek out Uncle Herb to get his opinion on the creatures, only to find him being devoured by the spawn. As the adult creature emerges and charges them, they run upstairs to barricade themselves in Charles's bedroom. Charles distracts the adult by turning on a radio, which it eats, causing an electrical fire which burns it. Pete and the others then see Kathy arriving and pull her into the bedroom just in time to save her from the beast. The teens decide to head for Pete's bedroom, where there is a phone to call for help with, but as they emerge, the adult creature pounces on them. Pete flees to another room and from there onto the roof; Frankie and Kathy run up to the attic, while Ellen stays in Charles' room. The creature easily breaks down the door, bites Ellen's head off and defenestrates her body. Peter returns through the attic window; but traumatized after seeing Ellen's body as well as his parents' car, the latter signaling to him they never left for their vacation, he becomes unhinged, fighting with Frankie to open the attic door, which attracts the creature.

Meanwhile, Charles has concocted a plan: he has filled a prop head with explosive flash powder, with a frayed electrical cord trailing behind to act as a fuse. He arrives in the attic before the creature can attack Peter and the others, spurring the creature into devouring the prop head. However, the cord proves too short to plug into an outlet. One of the spawn creatures appears and attacks Charles, but gets in the way of the adult when it lunges at Charles and ends up being eaten. Now that the monster is distracted and its mouth close enough, Charles manages to get to the outlet, igniting the powder and blowing up the adult.

With the threat revealed, a massive hunt is mobilized. Policemen and townspeople go around killing the alien spawn and burning the remains. Millie returns to the house to care for Pete and Charles as best she can, while Frankie and Kathy are taken away in an ambulance. That night, a lone patrolman stands guard outside the house. His contact on the CB radio is confident that the spawn has been wiped out, but then the patrolman hears a low rumbling, and sees the hill by the house lift up, revealing a fully-grown spawn of colossal size.

Cast
 Charles George Hildebrant as Charles
 Tom DeFranco as Pete
 Richard Lee Porter as Frankie
 Jean Talfer as Ellen
 Karen Tighe as Kathy
 James L. Brewster as Sam
 Elissa Neil as Barb
 Ethel Michelson as Aunt Millie
 John Schmerling as Uncle Herb
 Judith Mayes as Bunny

Production
Producer Ted Bohus said that he conceived the idea for The Deadly Spawn in 1979, and that he was inspired by an article in National Geographic about seed pods that were recovered from the Arctic. According to Bohus, he created an initial creature design that involved a man in a suit, but associate producer and effects director John Dods was unenthusiastic about that prospect. Several days later, Dods returned with several alternatives, including the "Mother Spawn" that was eventually used in the film.

Actor and director Tim Sullivan got his start in film as a 15-year-old production assistant on The Deadly Spawn. Dods was the brother of Sullivan's art teacher, and Sullivan earned the chance to work on the film as a result of that relationship. Among other tasks, Sullivan assisted in the manipulation of the main spawn puppet, which was made of rubber and controlled from below by wires.

Filming
Much of the film was shot in Gladstone, New Jersey; New Brunswick; and the Palisades Park home of the producer.

Soundtrack
The film score by Michael Perilstein was released by Perseverance Records on December 21, 2004. AllMusic awarded it 3.5 out of 5, with reviewer Jason Ankeny describing it as an "innovative score" that "deserves greater notoriety". Ankeny praised its atmosphere, and said that it successfully reached a "balance between serious musical aspirations and the tongue-in-cheek demands of the material".

Reception
AllMovie gave the film a positive review, describing the film as an "engaging, exciting sci-fi/horror adventure with realistic characters, effective acting and a willingness to betray expectations." The website Cool Ass Cinema wrote that the film is "not out to win any awards, it's simply there to entertain and in the most energetically gruesome fashion possible".

See also

References

External links
 
 
 
 WTF Films review of The Deadly Spawn Blu-ray re-release

1980s monster movies
American science fiction horror films
1980s science fiction horror films
1983 films
1983 horror films
American monster movies
American splatter films
American body horror films
Fictional parasites and parasitoids
Films set in the 1970s
Films shot in New Jersey
21st Century Film Corporation films
American exploitation films
1980s English-language films
1980s American films
Alien invasions in films